Tytherington Quarry is a 0.9 hectare geological Site of Special Scientific Interest near the village of Tytherington, South Gloucestershire, notified in 1989.

The quarry is still working, operated by Hanson Aggregates, and is connected by rail on the Thornbury branch line.

Sources

 English Nature citation sheet for the site  (accessed 13 July 2006)

Sites of Special Scientific Interest in Avon
South Gloucestershire District
Sites of Special Scientific Interest notified in 1989
Quarries in Gloucestershire